The Sandy Creek, a partlyperennial stream that is part of the Lachlan sub-catchment of the Murrumbidgee catchment within the Murray–Darling basin, is located in the Riverina region of New South Wales, Australia. The course of the Sandy Creek becomes indefinite at its mouth.

Course and features 
The Sandy Creek descends  over its  course.

See also 

 List of rivers of New South Wales (L-Z)
 Rivers of New South Wales

References

External links
 

Rivers of New South Wales
Tributaries of the Lachlan River
Rivers in the Riverina
Bland Shire